Middlesex Hospital may refer to:
Middlesex Hospital, a teaching hospital located in the Fitzrovia area of London, England, closed 2005
North Middlesex Hospital, a District General Hospital (DGH) in Edmonton in the London Borough of Enfield
West Middlesex Hospital, an acute NHS hospital in Isleworth, west London
Central Middlesex Hospital, a hospital in Park Royal, London
South Middlesex Hospital, a hospital in Isleworth, closed 1991
Middlesex Hospital (Connecticut)
Middlesex Hospital in New Brunswick, New Jersey, now Robert Wood Johnson University Hospital